Maurice "Mo" Martin (born July 2, 1964) is an American former professional basketball player. He played at Saint Joseph's University from 1982 to 1986 and was an Associated Press honorable mention All-American in his senior year.  The 1986 Atlantic 10 Player of the Year, he was a three-time selection to both the All-Conference team and the All-Big 5 squad. He is one of five Saint Joseph's Hawks to be chosen in the first round of the NBA Draft (drafted by the Denver Nuggets, taken 16th overall) 1986 NBA Draft. Martin played two seasons in the NBA, averaging 3.0 points per game in 69 games for the Nuggets. Martin was then selected by the Minnesota Timberwolves in the 1989 NBA expansion draft, but never played for the team, and ended up retiring completely from the NBA at the age of just 24 due to chronic knee pain. He is still the only player from Sullivan County, NY to ever play in the NBA.

Following his NBA career, he became a certified electrician and worked for the Pepsi Center for nearly 20 years as a supervisor that would transform the arena's playing surfaces

In 2016, he was diagnosed with Amyloidosis and as of 2020, is currently seeking a kidney transplant following complications of Amyloidosis.

References

External links
 

1964 births
Living people
American men's basketball players
Basketball players from New York (state)
Denver Nuggets draft picks
Denver Nuggets players
Minnesota Timberwolves expansion draft picks
People from Liberty, New York
Saint Joseph's Hawks men's basketball players
Shooting guards
Small forwards
Universiade medalists in basketball
Universiade silver medalists for the United States